Trionic is an engine management system developed by Saab Automobile. It consists of an engine control unit (ECU) that controls 3 engine aspects: 
 Ignition timing
 Fuel injection
 Acts as a boost controller.
The numerical prefix 'tri-' in Trionic. 'Ion' comes from the fact that it uses ion current, measured by the spark plugs between combustion events which acts as a sensor for knock, misfire and synchronization detection. The ion current stream which was developed within the ion sensing system due to combustion, can be deduced by monitoring the secondary current of the ignition coil. Using the value and wave shape of the current, after the actual spark event, the quality of the actual combustion process is determined, thus allowing the engine control unit to optimize the timing of the spark for the best engine performance while keeping emissions low on a much wider range of rpms.

Since Trionic 7, the throttle and thereby the air charge has also been electronically controlled, but the name "Trionic" was not changed accordingly as it was determined that the name had value.

History 
The SAAB Trionic engine management system was developed for the 9000 and 'New Generation' 900 turbocharged engines. The engine management system was first utilized on the Saab B204 and B234 "H" engines to monitor and control the fuel injection system and turbocharging pressure control.

The Trionic 5.2 and 5.5 systems utilized the manifold absolute pressure MAP sensor and the intake air charge temperature sensor to calculate the fuel injection curves, while the Trionic 7 and 8 systems are mass air flow type. Both systems have substantial differences that prevent utilization of components between the two. Generally speaking, engine tuners prefer the easier to work with Trionic 5 systems over the Trionic 7 and 8 which are more restrictive in what can be manipulated within the software.

The intellectual rights to the Trionic 5 and 7 systems were sold in 2009 to BAIC, along with the Saab H Engine that it was designed for, as part of Saab's restructuring and transfer of ownership of General Motors to Spyker.

Models and ECU information

Trionic systems are shortened to indicate their version; for e.g. T5, T7, T8, etc. The engines with T5 had red direct ignition modules which differentiated them visually from the T7 models which had a black ignition module. The ignition module on both T5 and T7 are an integral ignition coil and electronics that plug directly onto the spark plugs without the use of spark plug wires that are typically used in most engines.

SAAB Models Utilizing Trionic Engine Management System:
2nd Generation 900 ("NG900") 1994-1998  T5
9000 1994-1998  T5
1st Generation 9-3 1998  T5 (Except Viggen, which is T7)
1st Generation 9-3 2000 to 2002  T7
1st Generation 9-5 1998-2010 4Cyl  T7
2nd Generation 9-3 2003 to 2011 4cyl  T8

Projects/Aftermarket (Non OEM) tuning 
There are communities  working on reverse engineering electronic engine management systems ( EEMS) and particularly the Trionic EEMS. The work involves understanding the binary files stored in the ECU itself, and the changes that affect the car's hardware and operation of the vehicle. The T5, T7 and T8 management systems have been successfully manipulated to allow self-tuning for enthusiasts. 

There are also some alternative options such as interceptors like #Unichip that clamp the various inputs to the standard management systems, but they are restricted by the fact that fuel delivery generally cannot be easily increased as manipulation of the air-flow meter input and/or aggressive modifying of the ignition timing causes the Check Engine Light (CEL) to illuminate easily. This is due to a deviation between the expected and targeted torque and quality of emissions. 

It is, therefore, common to increase the fuel pressure across the board by using an aftermarket fuel pressure regulator when tuning is performed by these interceptor computers, trimming the fuel out instead. However, increased fuel pressure affects the engine's ability to idle due to injector lockup, therefore, an alternative solution of additional injectors instead of a raised-fuel-pressure regulator is proposed. The number of cars with such complex requirements such as Nira or MoTeC is very low so a full aftermarket engine management system is generally used in these cases.

Glossary
Sources include: Engine management system SAAB Trionic T5.5
 APC, Automatic Performance Control
 CDM, Combustion Detection Module 
 ECU, Engine control unit
 EGT, Exhaust gas temperature
 ETC, Electronic throttle control
 MAP, Manifold Absolute Pressure
 MIU, Main Instrument Unit
 ORVR, On board Refuelling Vapour Recovery system
 PWM, Pulse-width modulation
 SID, Saab Information Display
 TCS, Traction control system
 TPS, Throttle position sensor
 TWICE, Theft Warning Integrated Central Electronics
 VSS, Vehicle Speed Sensor
 WOT, Wide Open Throttle

References

External links 
 , formerly a Community dedicated to giving Trionic power to the people! This site is no longer online. Founded by Andrew J. Weaver and Steven A. Hayes and supported by the global SAAB community. 
 trionictuning.com, community driven exploration and development of new Trionic features, supported by the global SAAB community.

Engine control systems